José António Martins Vilaça (born 26 March 1985) is a Portuguese football player who plays as a centre back for Aliados Lordelo.

Club career
He made his professional debut in the Segunda Liga for Famalicão on 9 August 2015 in a game against Varzim.

References

External links
 
 José Vilaça at playmakerstats.com (English version of zerozero.pt)

1985 births
People from Santo Tirso
Living people
Portuguese footballers
F.C. Tirsense players
F.C. Famalicão players
Merelinense F.C. players
S.C. Salgueiros players
Rebordosa A.C. players
Liga Portugal 2 players
Association football defenders
Sportspeople from Porto District